Atractus schach, is a species of colubrid snake. It is found in French Guiana, Guyana, and Suriname. It is also known as Schach's ground snake.

References

Atractus
Snakes of South America
Reptiles of Guyana
Reptiles of French Guiana
Reptiles of Suriname
Reptiles described in 1827
Taxa named by Friedrich Boie